V-set and immunoglobulin domain containing 8 is a protein that in humans is encoded by the VSIG8 gene.

References

Further reading